Emanuele Naspetti (born 24 February 1968) is a racing driver and entrepreneur from Italy.

Career

Karting 
He made his racing debut at the age of 12 and spent seven years in karting (1980-1986), participating in more than 200 races and achieving success in Italian and international events.

Formula 3 
In 1987 he joined the Forti Corse Team to compete in the Italian Formula 3 Championship. In 1988, again with the Dallara-Alfa Romeo of Forti Corse, he was crowned Italian Formula 3 Champion.

Formula 3000 
In 1989 he competed in the FIA International Formula 3000 Championship with the Roni Motorsport Team. He enjoyed an extremely good debut season, resulting in him joining the Eddie Jordan Racing team for the following year to replace the reigning champion Jean Alesi, who had moved to Formula 1. 
In 1991 he rejoined Forti Corse and came very close to winning the title, taking four race wins. In the meantime he won his debut race (Varano, Class S2) in the Italian Superturismo Championship with the official Peugeot 405 racer.

Formula 1 
In 1992 he made his debut in Formula One at the wheel of a March-Ilmor, an important decision that forced him to abandon the FIA International Formula 3000 Championship while leading it a few races before the end. 
His Formula 1 career continued in 1993 with Jordan Grand Prix, as the team's official test driver. In the same year he took part in some races of the Japanese Formula 3000 Championship.

Touring and GT cars 
From 1994 Naspetti focused on racing saloon cars in Super Touring championships. With 27 wins he became the symbol of BMW's sporting heritage and in 1997 he won the Italian Superturismo Championship. In the same year he participated in the 24 Hours of Spa, winning the diesel classification and finishing third overall. 
In 2000 he participated in the 24 Hours of Le Mans driving a Lola-Judd, while his GT career began in 2001 with a Ferrari 550 Maranello run by the Rafanelli Team in the FIA GT Championship. 
In 2002 and 2003 he raced in the U.S. in the American Le Mans Series driving a Ferrari 550 Maranello. 
In 2004 he returned to Europe, again in the FIA GT Championship, at the wheel of a Ferrari 575 run by the GPC Team. 
In 2005, a call from the legendary Don Panoz, brought him back to the American scene, driving a Panoz in the 12 Hours of Sebring.
In 2006 he was at the wheel of a BMW in the reborn Italian Superturismo Championship, taking five wins and finishing second in the overall standings, while in 2009 he took part in the Porsche Carrera Cup in Italy, winning the race in Adria.

Racing record

Complete International Formula 3000 results
(key) (Races in bold indicate pole position) (Races in italics indicate fastest lap)

Complete Formula One results
(key)

Complete Japanese Formula 3000 results
(key) (Races in bold indicate pole position; races in italics indicate fastest lap)

Complete Italian Touring Car Championship results
(key) (Races in bold indicate pole position) (Races in italics indicate fastest lap)

Complete European Touring Car Championship results

Le Mans 24 Hours results

Complete World Touring Car Championship results
(key) (Races in bold indicate pole position) (Races in italics indicate fastest lap)

References

Italian racing drivers
Italian Formula One drivers
March Formula One drivers
Jordan Formula One drivers
Japanese Formula 3000 Championship drivers
World Touring Car Championship drivers
Italian Formula Three Championship drivers
1968 births
Living people
International Formula 3000 drivers
24 Hours of Le Mans drivers
American Le Mans Series drivers
24 Hours of Spa drivers
European Touring Car Championship drivers
BMW M drivers